Li Liqing (born 19 June 1993) is a Chinese judoka. She won the gold medal at the Women's 48 kg event at the 2016 Summer Paralympics.

References

External links 
 

1993 births
Living people
Chinese female judoka
Paralympic judoka of China
Paralympic gold medalists for China
Paralympic medalists in judo
Judoka at the 2016 Summer Paralympics
Medalists at the 2016 Summer Paralympics
Place of birth missing (living people)
21st-century Chinese women